Jaywick Sands railway station was the lower terminus of the 18-inch gauge Jaywick Miniature Railway in Essex, UK.

History
Jaywick Sands had a single platform built of wood, which was provided with a single wooden bench, palisade fencing and electric lamps. Jaywick Sands also (unlike Crossways) had a small wooden ticket-office, though most tickets were sold on the trains. Because the JMR had no turntable, the locomotives always ran tender-first into Jaywick Sands.

The original route of the JMR closed in 1939, but in 1949, the lower half was briefly re-opened, running during the 1949 summer season only. The section in question would have been midway round the 180-degree curve, around half a mile from Jaywick Sands.

References

Railway stations in Great Britain opened in 1936
Railway stations in Great Britain closed in 1939
Disused railway stations in Essex